Acacia lanigera, commonly known as woolly wattle or hairy wattle, is a tree species that is endemic south eastern Australia.

Description

Taxonomy
Three varieties are currently recognised:
Acacia lanigera var. gracilipes Benth., occurring in the Wallagaraugh River area in south-eastern New South Wales and Victoria.
Acacia lanigera A.Cunn. var. lanigera
Acacia lanigera var. whanii (F.Muell. ex Benth.) Pescott, a variety first collected from Skipton, Victoria by William Taylor Whan.

The variety venulosa is currently regarded as a species in its own right - Acacia venulosa.

Distribution
The species occurs in New South Wales, Victoria and the Australian Capital Territory. It was first formally described by botanist Allan Cunningham in Geographical Memoirs on New South Wales in 1825. He described it as "a shrub frequent on rocky barren ranges in the interior".

Cultivation
The species prefers a well-drained sunny situation and will tolerate frosts down to -7 Celsius. It is adaptable to use in situations where maintenance is infrequent such as road batters.

References

lanigera
Flora of the Australian Capital Territory
Flora of New South Wales
Flora of Victoria (Australia)
Fabales of Australia